Season Of Ash is a novel by American writer Justin Bryant, published in February 2004 by ENC Press of Hoboken, New Jersey.

The novel tells the story of three South Africans and one stranded American dealing with the chaos and confusion immediately prior to Nelson Mandela being elected President of South Africa in 1994.

2004 American novels
Apartheid novels
Cultural depictions of Nelson Mandela
Fiction set in 1994
Novels set in South Africa